Johann Michael Friedrich Rückert (16 May 1788 – 31 January 1866) was a German poet, translator, and professor of Oriental languages.

Biography
Johann Michael Friedrich Rückert was born in Schweinfurt and was the eldest son of a lawyer, Johann Adam Rückert, and his wife, Maria Barbara, born Schwappach. He was educated at the local Gymnasium and at the universities of Würzburg and Heidelberg. From 1816 to 1817, he worked on the editorial staff of the Morgenblatt at Stuttgart. Nearly the whole of the year 1818 he spent in Rome, and afterwards he lived for several years at Coburg (1820–1826). Rückert married Luise Wiethaus-Fischer there in 1821. He was appointed a professor of Oriental languages at the University of Erlangen in 1826, and, in 1841, he was called to a similar position in Berlin, where he was also made a privy councillor. In 1849 he resigned his professorship at Berlin, and went to live full-time in his Gut (estate) at Neuses (now a part of Coburg).

When Rückert began his literary career, Germany was engaged in her life-and-death struggle with Napoleon; and in his first volume, Deutsche Gedichte (German Poems), published in 1814 under the pseudonym Freimund Raimar, he gave, particularly in the powerful Geharnischte Sonette (Sonnets in Arms/Harsh Words), vigorous expression to the prevailing sentiment of his countrymen. During 1815 to 1818 appeared Napoleon, eine politische Komödie in drei Stücken (Napoleon, a Political Comedy in Three Parts) of which only two parts were published; and in 1817 Der Kranz der Zeit (The Wreath of Time).

He issued a collection of poems, Östliche Rosen (Eastern Roses), in 1822; and from 1834 to 1838 his Gesammelte Gedichte (Collected Poems) were published in six volumes, a selection which has passed through many editions.

Rückert was master of thirty languages and made his mark chiefly as a translator of Oriental poetry and as a writer of poems conceived in the spirit of Oriental masters. Much attention was attracted by a translation of the Maqamat of Al-Hariri of Basra (Hariris Makamen) in 1826, Nal und Damajanti, an Indian tale, in 1828, Rostem und Suhrab, eine Heldengeschichte (Rostem and Suhrab, a Story of Heroes) in 1830, and Hamasa, oder die ältesten arabischen Volkslieder (Hamasa, or the Oldest Arabian Folk Songs) in 1846.

Among his original writings dealing with Oriental subjects are:

Morgenländische Sagen und Geschichten (Oriental Myths and Poems) (1837)
Erbauliches und Beschauliches aus dem Morgenland (Edifying and Contemplative, from the Orient) (1836–1838)
Brahmanische Erzählungen (Brahmin Stories) (1839).

The most elaborate of his works is Die Weisheit des Brahmanen (The Wisdom of the Brahmins), published in six volumes from 1836 to 1839. The former and Liebesfrühling (Spring of Love) (1844), a cycle of love-songs, are the best known of all Rückert's productions.

From 1843 to 1845 he issued the dramas Saul und David (1843), Herodes der Große ("Herod the Great") (1844), Kaiser Heinrich IV (1845) and Christofero Colombo (1845), all of which are considered greatly inferior to the work to which he owes his place in German literature. At the time of the Danish war in 1864 he wrote Ein Dutzend Kampflieder für Schleswig-Holstein (A Dozen Battle Songs for Schleswig-Holstein), which, although published anonymously, made considerable impression on audiences.

He is buried in the cemetery there.

He continues to exert a strong influence on Oriental studies in Germany (c.f. Annemarie Schimmel).

Rückert's poetry was a powerful inspiration to composers and there are about 121 settings of his work – behind only Goethe, Heine and Rilke in this respect. Among the composers who set his poetry to music are Schubert, Robert and Clara Schumann, Brahms (Two Songs for Voice, Viola and Piano, among others), Josef Rheinberger, Mahler (song cycles Kindertotenlieder, Rückert-Lieder), Max Bruch, Max Reger, Elise Schmezer, Amalie Scholl, Richard Strauss, Zemlinsky, Hindemith, Bartók, Berg, Hugo Wolf, Heinrich Kaspar Schmid, and Jah Wobble.

Memorials

A monument to Rückert is situated at Marktplatz in Schweinfurt. The monument of Rückert, whose birth house stands at the southeast corner of the town hall, has stood in the central square of Schweinfurt since 1890. It was created by architect Friedrich Ritter von Thiersch and sculptor Wilhelm von Rühmann. Allegorical figures from his works – Geharnischte Sonette ("Withering Sonnets") and Weisheit des Brahmanen ("Wisdom of the Brahmans") – are situated at the feet of the bronze Rückert.

Rückert is also commemorated by a small museum in his home at Neuses (now in Friedrich-Rückert-Strasse) and a park, Rückertpark which also features a memorial bust. The museum in the Friedrich-Rückert-Straße houses over 1,000 dolls, including the grandmother of the world-famous "Barbie".

Literature

A comprehensive but by no means complete edition of Rückert's poetical works appeared in 12 volumes in 1868–1869. Subsequent editions have been edited by L. Laistner (1896), C. Beyer (1896), G. Ellinger (1897). See B. Fortlage, F. Rückert und seine Werke (1867); C. Beyer, Friedrich Rückert, ein biographisches Denkmal (1868), Neue Mitteilungen über Rückert (1873), and Nachgelassene Gedichte Rückerts und neue Beiträge zu dessen Leben und Schriften (1877); R. Boxberger, Rückert-Studien (1878); P. de Lagarde, Erinnerungen an F. Rückert (1886); F. Muncker, Friedrich Rückert (1890); G. Voigt, Rückerts Gedankenlyrik (1891).
 Hans Wollschläger und Rudolf Kreutner (Ed.): Historisch-kritische Ausgabe in Einzelbänden, Schweinfurt 1998ff.; thus far 4 vols. in 5 parts (as of July 2004):
 Die Weisheit des Brahmanen, 2 vols., 1998.
 Gedichte von Rom, 2000.
 Liedertagebuch I/II, 1846–1847, 2001
 Liedertagebuch III/IV, 1848–1849, 2002.
 Liedertagebuch V/VI, 1850–1851, Erster Band, 2003.
 Hans Wollschläger (Ed.): Kindertotenlieder [1993 also as insel taschenbuch 1545].
 Hartmut Bobzin (Ed.): Der Koran in der Übersetzung von Friedrich Rückert, 4th ed., Würzburg 2001.
 Friedrich Rückert: Firdosi's Königsbuch (Schahname) Sage I–XIII. Aus dem Nachlaß herausgegeben von E. A. Bayer. 1890. Nachdruck: epubli GmbH, Berlin, 2010 
 Friedrich Rückert: Firdosi's Königsbuch (Schahname) Sage XX–XXVI. Aus dem Nachlaß herausgegeben von E. A. Bayer. Nachdruck der Erstausgabe. epubli Berlin, 2010, . (Details)
 Wolfgang von Keitz (Hrsg.): Oestliche Rosen.  epubli, Berlin 2012,  . (Details)

In 1847, Rückert also translated select verses of the Tirukkural, an ancient Tamil classic, into German.

Notes

References

External links

 
  
 
List of song settings
Poems of Friedrich Rueckert – complete listing

 Flyer on Rückert published by the town of Coburg (German) 
 Friedrich Rückert Obituary, The Atlantic Monthly (1866)

1788 births
1866 deaths
19th-century German poets
German orientalists
People from Schweinfurt
University of Würzburg alumni
Heidelberg University alumni
Academic staff of the University of Erlangen-Nuremberg
Academic staff of the Humboldt University of Berlin
Recipients of the Pour le Mérite (civil class)
Translators of the Quran into German
German male poets
19th-century German male writers
Tamil–German translators
Translators of the Tirukkural into German
German male non-fiction writers
19th-century translators
Tirukkural translators
Artists from Coburg
Morgenblatt für gebildete Stände editors